Hugh Joseph McDermott is an electronics engineer with the Bionic Ear Institute of the University of Melbourne in East Melbourne, Australia. McDermott was named a Fellow of the Institute of Electrical and Electronics Engineers (IEEE) in 2012 for his contributions to improved sound processing techniques for cochlear implants and hearing aids.

References

External links 
 https://patents.google.com/patent/CA2361544C/en_2
 https://patents.google.com/patent/EP1172020A4
 https://patents.google.com/patent/EP1532841A1/fr
 https://scholar.google.com.au/scholar?hl=en&as_sdt=0%2C5&q=%22Hugh+Joseph+McDermott%22&btnG=

Fellow Members of the IEEE
Living people
Australian computer scientists
Year of birth missing (living people)